Northern Lights is the debut novel of Tim O'Brien. The novel, originally published in August of 1975, focuses on the relationship of two brothers. Much of the plot is set during a cross-country ski trip.

Reception

Initial reviews of Northern Lights were mixed, but many critics noted the heavy influence of Ernest Hemingway upon the style, mood, and tone of the novel. One critic observed that O’Brien’s writing style in this novel is a “deliberate parody” of Hemingway.

Upon its publication in 1975, Kirkus Reviews wrote that: 

Alasdair Maclean, in the Times Literary Supplement, concluded that "O'Brien's ambition outreaches his gifts."  
 
At the time of its publication, Northern Lights was generally seen as a promising debut novel from a young writer. After a 50 year writing career (as of 2023), it’s now viewed as perhaps O’Brien’s most flawed book.

References

1975 American novels
Novels by Tim O'Brien (author)
Novels set in Minnesota
1975 debut novels
Books by Tim O'Brien (author)
Novels set in the United States